Pinball arcade may refer to:

 Amusement arcade, a place with pinball machines 
 The Pinball Arcade, a pinball video game developed by FarSight Studios
 Microsoft Pinball Arcade, a pinball video game from Microsoft
 Pinball Arcade (video game), a 1994 game by Spidersoft

See also
 Arcade Pinball